Lighthouse Hill may refer to:

 Lighthouse Hill, Staten Island
 Lighthouse Hill (film), a 2004 British film
 Light House Hill, Mangalore